Les enfants de l'orage is the fifth studio album by French pop-R&B singer-songwriter Leslie, released on February 4, 2013.

Track listing 
 "Des mots invincibles"
 "Ma génération"
 "Les enfants de l'orage"
 "Où va le monde ?"
 "En silence"
 "L'Amour et les couleurs"
 "Tous les moi"
 "Je me fous"
 "Over"
 "Pour le meilleur et le pire"
 "La Promesse"
 "Je te donne" (featuring Ivyrise)
 Des mots invincibles (featuring Youssoupha)

References

2013 albums
Leslie (singer) albums